Tacita Charlotte Dean CBE, RA (born 1965) is a British / German visual artist who works primarily in film. She was a nominee for the Turner Prize in 1998, won the Hugo Boss Prize in 2006, and was elected to the Royal Academy of Arts in 2008. She lives and works in Berlin, Germany, and Los Angeles, California.

Early life and education
Dean was born in Canterbury, Kent. Her mother is named Jenefer and her father was Joseph Dean, a lawyer who studied classics at Merton College, Oxford. She has a sister named Antigone and a brother, the architect Ptolemy Dean. Her grandfather was Basil Dean, the founder of Ealing Studios.

Dean was educated at Kent College, Canterbury. After a foundation year in Canterbury, she studied at Falmouth University, graduating in 1988. From 1990 to 1992, Dean studied for a master's degree at the Slade School of Fine Art.

Career
In 1995, Dean was included in General Release: Young British Artists held at the XLVI Venice Biennale. She is one of the "key names", along with Jake and Dinos Chapman, Gary Hume, Sam Taylor-Wood, Fiona Banner and Douglas Gordon, of the Young British Artists (YBAs). Her work actually had little in common with the prominent YBAs, Damien Hirst and Tracey Emin.

In 1997, Dean moved to London. That same year she began to exhibit splices of magnetic tape cut the length required to document the duration of the sound indicated, such as a raven's cry. In 2001 she was given a solo show entitled Tacita Dean: Recent films and Other Works at Tate Britain. For the season 2004/2005 in the Vienna State Opera Dean designed the large scale picture (176 sqm) "Play as Cast" as part of the exhibition series Safety Curtain, conceived by museum in progress.

In 2014 Dean became an artist in residence at the Getty Research Institute. She is a founding member of savefilm.org and vigorously campaigns to save the medium of film.

Work

Film
Dean is best known for her work in 16 mm film, although she utilises a variety of media including drawing, photography and sound. Her films often employ long takes and steady camera angles to create a contemplative atmosphere. Her anamorphic films are shot by cinematographers John Adderley and Jamie Cairney. Her sound recordist is Steve Felton. She has also published several pieces of her own writing, which she refers to as 'asides,' which complement her visual work. Since the mid-1990s her films have not included commentary, but are instead accompanied by often understated optical sound tracks.

The sea was a persistent theme in Dean's work, especially during the 1990s. During that decade, she explored the tragic maritime misadventures of Donald Crowhurst, an amateur English sailor whose ambition to enter a race to solo circumnavigate the globe ended in deception, existential crisis and, eventually, tragedy. Dean has made a number of films and blackboard drawings relating to the Crowhurst story, exploiting the metaphorical richness of such motifs as the ocean, lighthouses and shipwrecks. Re-turning to her attraction with the sea, Amadeus (swell consopio) was made for the Folkestone Triennial (three-year art show) in 2008.

In 1997, Dean made an audio work based on her futile effort to find the submerged artwork Spiral Jetty by Robert Smithson in the Great Salt Lake of Utah.

Sound Mirrors (1999) takes its name from the tracking devices built during the 1920s and 1930s and planted in the Kent countryside to detect incoming German aircraft.

In 2000, Dean was awarded a one-year German Academic Exchange Service (DAAD) scholarship to Berlin, where she moved that year with her partner, artist Mathew Hale. She devoted attention to the architecture and cultural history of Germany, making films of such iconic structure as the Palast der Republik. Fernsehturm, is a 44-minute film set in the revolving cafe of the East Berlin television tower, completed in 1969 on Alexanderplatz. Other projects have concerned important figures in post-war German cultural history, such as W. G. Sebald and Joseph Beuys.

Recent films capture important artists and thinkers of the last fifty years and feature Mario Merz, Merce Cunningham, Leo Steinberg, Julie Mehretu, Claes Oldenburg, and Cy Twombly. For example, Craneway Event (2008) is a film about Cunningham working on something with his dancers over three afternoons on site.

In 2006, Dean shot Kodak, a movie in a Kodak factory in eastern France — the last one in Europe to produce 16-mm film stock. A few weeks after she visited, it closed for good.

In 2013, Dean exhibited JG, a 26-minute 35 mm film in colour and black and white at the Frith Street Gallery in London. The film returns to Dean's fascination with the famous land artwork Spiral Jetty by Robert Smithson and her friendship with the science-fiction writer J. G. Ballard. During the film, the viewer also hears excerpts from the writings and correspondence of Ballard as well as of Smithson, all read by actor Jim Broadbent.

Photography and painting
In 2001 Dean published Floh, a book in two parts that used found photographs from the flea markets of Europe and America. Dean said of Floh: "I do not want to give these images explanations: descriptions by the finder about how and where they were found, or guesses as to what stories they might or might not tell. I want them to keep the silence of the fleamarket; the silence they had when I found them; the silence of the lost object." Similarly, in 2002 Dean created Czech Photos (1991-2002), a series of over 326 unedited photographs presented in a box for intimate engagement. The black and white photographs show a city in the moments before radical change, already somehow out of date the second they were taken. Washington Cathedral (2002) is a series of more than 130 found postcards from the first half of the last century showing various imagined versions of the cathedral in Washington, DC before it was completed. Palindrome is a newspaper project celebrating the palindromic date 20.02 2002, which was inspired by numbers painted by Marcel Broodthaers on a beam in his studio. In 2005, Dean began work on a series of found postcards of trees, which she transformed by painting out all the background detail with white gouache.

Commissions
Dean has undertaken commissions for London's former Millennium Dome, the Sadler's Wells Theatre, and for Cork, Ireland, as part of that city's European City of Culture celebrations. She has also completed residencies at the Sundance Institute, the Wexner Center for the Arts, Columbus, U.S., and the Deutscher Akademischer Austauschdienst, Berlin

In 2011, Dean was the 12th artist commissioned by the Unilever Series to create a unique artwork for the Turbine Hall of the Tate Modern. The result, FILM, was an 11-minute silent film shot on 35 mm film that was projected onto a 13-meter screen and sought "not only to invigorate debate about the threat film is under but also to stand as a testament to the distinctive qualities of this unique medium."

Exhibitions

Selected solo exhibitions 
Tacita Dean and Gerco de Ruijter, Witte de With Center for Contemporary Art, Rotterdam (1997)
Tacita Dean, Institute of Contemporary Art, Philadelphia, (1998) 
Tacita Dean, Museum De Pont, Tilburg, (1998) 
Tacita Dean, Madison Museum of Contemporary Art, Madison, WI, (1999)
Museum für Gegenwartskunst, Basel (2000)
Tacita Dean, MACBA, Barcelona (2001) 
Tacita Dean: Recent Films and Other Works, Tate Britain (2001) 
Tacita Dean, Tate St Ives (2005) 
Tacita Dean. Analogue: Films, Photographs, Drawings 1991–2006, Schaulager, Basel (2006). The most comprehensive retrospective of her work to date, Analogue, held at Schaulager Basel.
Hugo Boss Prize 2006: Tacita Dean, Guggenheim Museum, (2006) 
Still Life, Palazzo Dugnani, Nicola Trussardi Foundation, Milan (2009). Dean's first major solo exhibition in Italy, on the first floor (piano nobile) of Palazzo Dugnani, a historic building in the centre of Milan. A selection of fourteen works, including the world premiere of two films commissioned and produced by the Foundation: Still Life and Day for Night, filmed in the Bolognese studio of painter Giorgio Morandi.
... my English breath in foreign clouds. Tacita Dean, Marian Goodman Gallery, New York City (2016).
Tacita Dean: Woman with a Red Hat, The Fruitmarket Gallery, Edinburgh (2018). 
Tacita Dean: Still Life, The National Gallery, London (2018).
Tacita Dean: Portrait, National Portrait Gallery, London (2018).
Tacita Dean: Landscape, Royal Academy of Arts, London (2018).
Tacita Dean: Antigone, Kunstmuseum Basel, Basel (2021-2022).

Group exhibitions and exhibitions during festivals
São Paulo Art Biennial (2006; 2010)
Venice Biennale (2003; 2005; 2013)
dOCUMENTA (13)

Recognition
Following her 1996 film Disappearance at Sea, Dean was nominated for the Turner Prize in 1998. She has since been awarded the Aachen Art Prize (2002), Hugo Boss Prize (2006), and the Kurt Schwitters Prize (2009), among others. In 2011, Blake Gopnik listed Dean among "The 10 Most Important Artists of Today".

She was appointed Officer of the Order of the British Empire (OBE) in the 2013 New Year Honours for services to British art overseas.

Dean was the recipient of the 2019 TenTen artist commission, and the 2019 Cherry Kearton Medal and Award.

Filmography

See also
Ptolemy Dean

References

Further reading
 Barcelona 2001: Tacita Dean. Barcelona: Museu d'Art Contemporani de Barcelona and Actar.
 Godfrey, Mark: Photography Found and Lost: On Tacita Dean's Floh, October vol. 114, Fall 2005, 90–119.
 Royoux, Jean-Christophe, Marina Warner and Germaine Greer: Tacita Dean. London: Phaidon Press, 2006.
 Trodd, T.: Film at the End of the Twentieth Century: Obsolescence and Medium in the Work of Tacita Dean, Object 6, 2003/4.
 Vischer, Theodora. and Friedli, I.: Tacita Dean. Analogue: Drawings 1991–2006. Basel: Schaulager, 2006.
 De Cecco, Emanuela: Tacita Dean. Milano: postmedia books, 2004.
 Obrist, Hans Ulrich: The Conversation Series: Tacita Dean. Köln: Walther König, 2013.

External links
Stillness. Una Danza para la Quietud: Cage, Cunningham, Dean
Tacita Dean in the Tate Collection – artist biography and works
Tacita Dean: Film – exhibition at Tate Modern 2011–2012
Tacita Dean – Aerial View of Teignmouth Electron, Cayman Brac. 16 September 1998
Waterlog exhibition featuring Michael Hamburger (2007) (requires Flash Player)
Tacita Dean at Fondazione Nicola Trussardi
Works by Tacita Dean in Cal Cego. Contemporary Art Collection
Tacita Dean works at the Menil Collection

1965 births
Living people
20th-century English women artists
21st-century English women artists
Alumni of Falmouth University
Alumni of the Slade School of Fine Art
British conceptual artists
English contemporary artists
English experimental filmmakers
Commanders of the Order of the British Empire
Members of the Academy of Arts, Berlin
People educated at Kent College
People from Canterbury
Royal Academicians
Women conceptual artists
Women experimental filmmakers